Valeriy Senko (born 7 April 1998) is a Belarusian professional footballer who plays for Isloch Minsk Raion.

References

External links 
 
 

1998 births
Living people
Belarusian footballers
People from Baranavichy
Sportspeople from Brest Region
Association football midfielders
FC Shakhtyor Soligorsk players
FC Luch Minsk (2012) players
FC Slavia Mozyr players
FC Arsenal Dzerzhinsk players
FC Isloch Minsk Raion players